Abdysh-Ata-99 (Футбол клубу "Абдыш-Ата-99" Кант) is a Kyrgyzstani football club based in Kant, Kyrgyzstan. It is named after a local brewery. The club was founded in 2000.

History 
2006: Founded as Abdysh-Ata-FShM Kant.
2008: Renamed to FC Abdysh-Ata-91 Kant.
2010: Renamed to FC Abdysh-Ata-94 Kant.
2016: Renamed to FC Abdysh-Ata-99 Kant.

Achievements
Kyrgyzstan League:
8th place: 2007

Kyrgyzstan Cup:

Current squad

External links 
Career stats by KLISF
Profile at sport.kg

Football clubs in Kyrgyzstan
2006 establishments in Kyrgyzstan